Al-Zaazu' is a village in northern Syria, administratively part of Raqqa Governorate, located north of Raqqa. According to the Syria Central Bureau of Statistics (CBS), al-Zaazu' had a population of 779 in the 2004 census.

References

Populated places in Tell Abyad District
Villages in Syria